Depictions of religious figures may refer to:

 Depictions of Jesus
 Depictions of Muhammad
 Depictions of Gautama Buddha in film